David Alexander Anderson (1952–2015) was a director of animated films.

In 1983 he won a BAFTA Award for Dreamland Express. Deadsy and the Sexo-Chanjo received a BAFTA nomination in 1991. Door also won several awards at major international film festivals.

Biography
Dreamland Express takes its inspiration from a children's book of 1927 by the illustrator H. R. Millar.

Filmography
In the Time of Angels (which he also wrote)
Deadsy and the Sexo-Chanjo
Dreamless Sleep
Door (Both Deadsy and Door came under the heading "Deadtime Stories for Big Folk")
Dreamland Express

References

External links
 
 David Anderson biography at BFI Screenonline
 Obituary
 

1952 births
2015 deaths
British animators
British animated film directors